Serianthes margaretae is a species of flowering plant in the family Fabaceae. It is found only in New Caledonia.

References

margaretae
Endemic flora of New Caledonia
Vulnerable plants
Taxonomy articles created by Polbot